Reginald Forester (20 March 1892 – 9 December 1959) was an English footballer who played for Stoke.

Career
Forester was born in Penkhull and began his career with Kidsgrove Wellington. He joined Manchester City in 1911 but failed to make an appearance and left for Stoke in 1912. He played twice for Stoke before World War I and following the hostilities he played seven matches in 1920–21. He left at the end of the season for non-league Macclesfield and then Congleton Town.

Career statistics

References

English footballers
Macclesfield Town F.C. players
Manchester City F.C. players
Stoke City F.C. players
English Football League players
Southern Football League players
Congleton Town F.C. players
People from Penkhull
1892 births
1959 deaths
Association football wing halves